Ronald Alexander Lewis is a former professional American football player who played wide receiver for four seasons for the San Francisco 49ers and Green Bay Packers in the National Football League. He graduated from William M. Raines High School in 1986 in Jacksonville, Florida.

1968 births
Living people
William M. Raines High School alumni
Players of American football from Jacksonville, Florida
American football wide receivers
Florida State Seminoles football players
San Francisco 49ers players
Green Bay Packers players